Sainyam is a 1994 Malayalam-language film written by S. N. Swamy and directed by Joshi. Starring Mammootty, Mukesh, Priya Raman, Mohini, Vikram, Dileep and Sukumaran in main roles. The film score and soundtrack were composed by S. P. Venkatesh.

This movie was dedicated to the Indian Air Force. The film was dubbed and released in Tamil as Jai India.

Plot
The story is about the life of Indian Air Force officer Group Captain Eashwar who engages himself into a project called "Red Alert," which involves the renovation of condemned aircraft. He is 35, unmarried and interested in the Research Wing of the Indian Air Force. Eshwar is assisted by Wing Commander Zakir.

As a cover, the research is being conducted at an India Air Force Academy. The cadets Jiji, Thomas a.k.a. 'Kokku' Thoma and more especially Shradha Kaul provide comic relief.

Meanwhile, there are terrorists/anti-nationals trying to steal the project's secrets.

The movie ends with a note stating " A tribute to the Indian Air Force".

Cast

Mammootty as Group Captain A.J.Eashwar
Mukesh as Wing Commander Zakir Ali
Priya Raman as Cadet Shradha Kaul
Mohini as Lakshmi
Vikram as Cadet Jiji
Dileep as Cadet 'Kokku' Thomas
Abi as Cadet Das
Mukundan as Cadet Biju
Rajeev Rangan as Cadet
T.S Krishnan as Sikh Cadet
Sukumaran as Air Vice Marshal Nambiar, Eashwar's Superior officer
Prem Kumar as Ramu, Eashwar's cook
Sonia as Fathima,Wife of Zakir
Valsala Menon as Eashwar's Aunt
Kozhikode Narayanan Nair as Swaminathan, Eashwar's Uncle
Devan Sreenivasan as Sreenath IPS, Commissioner of Police
K.P.A.C. Sunny as Defence Minister
Ravikumar as Major Sreeram
Santhosh as Baiju, military commando
Rasheed Ummer as Chacko, military commando
Appa Haja as Kannan, military commando
Vijay Menon as Salim, Terrorist
Ajay Rathnam as Terrorist
 Ravi Jack as Terrorist
Nandhu as Rajan, Salesman
Jagadish (Cameo)
Vijayaraghavan (Cameo)

Production 
The film was shot at the Air Force Academy in Dundigal. The shoot was originally scheduled for November, but was postponed to March after Mammootty got chicken pox.

Music
Shibu Chakravarthy wrote all the lyrics.

"Mercury" - Sujatha Mohan, Mano, Malgudi Subha
"Chellacherukaatte" - Sujatha Mohan, G Venugopal
"Kallikkuyile" - K. S. Chithra
"Baggy Jeansum" - Krishnachandran, Lekha R Nair, Mano, Sindhu Devi	Shibu Chakravarthy
"Puthan Kathir" - R Usha
"Vaarmudithumpil" - K. S. Chithra, G Venugopal
"Nenchil Idanenchil" - Krishnachandran

Release
The film was released on 15 September 1994.

Box office
The film was both commercial and critical success.

Legacy 
The song "Bagy Jeansum" was paid homage with a reference in the interlude of the song Kinnam Katta Kallan" in the 2018 film Kaly.

References

External links
 

1990s Malayalam-language films
1993 films
Films about terrorism in India
Indian aviation films
Films directed by Joshiy
Films shot in Kollam
Indian action war films
1990s action war films
Indian Air Force in films
Films scored by S. P. Venkatesh